John Frederick Christgau (February 11, 1934 – August 21, 2018) was an American author of fiction and non-fiction.

Christgau was born in Crookston, Minnesota.  He later moved to California, where he attended San Francisco State University.  He taught at several high schools and coached Crestmoor High School's first varsity basketball team, in San Bruno, California. He lived in Belmont, California.

His books have dealt primarily with sports and American history.  His book, Michael and the Whiz Kids (2013), is the story of Christgau's experiences as coach of a championship, lightweight basketball team that featured the first African American athlete in Crestmoor High School's history.  This book was followed by Incident at the Otterville Station: A Civil War Story of Slavery and Rescue, the true story of the rescue of slaves that were to be shipped from Missouri to Kentucky, in defiance of federal laws.

Christgau died following a heart attack on August 21, 2018.

List of works

References

1934 births
2018 deaths
Writers from Minnesota
High school basketball coaches in California
San Francisco State Gators men's basketball players
People from Polk County, Minnesota
People from Belmont, California
Sports historians
American men's basketball players